Giancarlo Ramos Rodolpho (born 14 February 1985), known as Gian Wolverine, is a Brazilian futsal player who plays as a goalkeeper for Carlos Barbosa and the Brazilian national futsal team.

References

External links
Liga Nacional de Futsal profile

1985 births
Living people
Futsal goalkeepers
Brazilian men's futsal players
ADC Intelli players